The Encyclopedia of India is a four-volume encyclopedia on Indian history and culture under editor-in-chief Stanley Wolpert.  The series was published by Gale (Cengage) in November 2005 under .

The Library Journal has described Wolpert's work as "outstanding"

Notes

External links
Reviews for Encyclopedia of India. according to its publisher, Gale Cengage

2005 non-fiction books
Indian encyclopedias
English-language encyclopedias
Books about India
Encyclopedias of culture and ethnicity
21st-century encyclopedias
21st-century Indian books